William John Sharpe (January 23, 1932 – December 28, 1995) was an athlete from the United States, competing in the triple jump. A three-time Olympian he won the gold medal in the men's triple jump event at the 1963 Pan American Games in Brazil.

References

External links
 

1932 births
1995 deaths
American male triple jumpers
Athletes (track and field) at the 1956 Summer Olympics
Athletes (track and field) at the 1959 Pan American Games
Athletes (track and field) at the 1960 Summer Olympics
Athletes (track and field) at the 1963 Pan American Games
Athletes (track and field) at the 1964 Summer Olympics
Olympic track and field athletes of the United States
Track and field athletes from Philadelphia
Pan American Games gold medalists for the United States
Pan American Games bronze medalists for the United States
Pan American Games medalists in athletics (track and field)
Medalists at the 1959 Pan American Games
Medalists at the 1963 Pan American Games